Bras d'Eau National Park is one of only three national parks in Mauritius. It is located in the north-east of the island.

Flora and fauna
After the original Mauritian forests were destroyed, most of the land was used for commercial plantations of alien trees such as Mahogany, Araucaria, Tecoma and Eucalyptus. The majority of the National Park's land still lies beneath these plantations. However patches of the original biodiversity remain.

Two species of the giant Mauritian ebony trees still survive in small numbers - Diospyros melanida and Diospyros egrettarum. They previously formed part of the original indigenous forests of the area, together with other surviving endemics such as Sideroxylon boutonianum ("Bois de Fer"). 
Smaller local plants include critically rare ferns, such as Doryopteris pilosa and the aquatic Acrostichum aureum, as well as the orchid Oeoniella polystachys.

Of the animal life, most of the larger species are already extinct. However, the park still serves as a preserve for several rare and endemic bird species.

Proclamation and History
The name of the area derives from the arm-like shape of the elegantly winding body of water that stretches inland from the sea ("Bras d'Eau" = "Arm of Water") in between Belcourt Bay and Point Radeau.

Most of the original indigenous Mauritian forests of the area and their wildlife were destroyed early on, and were replaced with commercial timber plantations. Small patches of the original Mauritian biodiversity survived however, and the presence of remnants of critically endangered endemics prompted the establishment of the National Park.

The Park was established on the 25 October 2011, as the second of Mauritius's two land-based national parks (the third national park of the country, Islets, is off the north-east coast). This was done according to Section 11(1) of the 1993 Wildlife and National Parks Act.

Like the other national parks, it is managed by the Mauritian National Parks and Conservation Service. However unlike the more famous Black River Gorges, Bras d'Eau is far quieter and more rarely visited.

Location
The National Park is located in the north east of Mauritius, on the coast near Poste Lafayette.

In addition to a plethora of ponds of indigenous ferns and orchids, the Mare Sarcelle is home to mangrove swamps and large numbers of birds. It is becoming popular as a hiking and bird-watching site.

Along with its natural environment, the park is also the site of the Mauritius Radio Telescope. There are also historic 200-year-old ruins in the forest, including the remains of a sugar mill and lime kiln.

There is a picnic site with wooden tables in the forest, and the walking trails are labelled.

References

National parks of Mauritius
Flacq District
Protected areas established in 2011